Radoslaw Kaminski (born September 28, 1989) is a Polish football player. His brother is Krzysztof Kamiński.

Playing career
Radoslaw Kaminski played for J3 League club; Fujieda MYFC in 2015.

References

External links

1989 births
Living people
Polish footballers
J3 League players
Fujieda MYFC players
Place of birth missing (living people)
Association football defenders